BBRC could refer to:

Biochemical and Biophysical Research Communications, a biological journal
British Birds Rarities Committee